Roland Dannö (born 13 February 1966) is a former international speedway rider from Sweden.

Speedway career 
Dannö won the silver medal at the 1988 Swedish Championship. He rode in the top tier of British Speedway from 1987 to 1988, riding for Hackney Hawks and Belle Vue Aces.

Family
His brother Stefan Dannö was also a speedway rider.

References 

Living people
1966 births
Swedish speedway riders
Belle Vue Aces riders
Hackney Hawks riders
People from Östersund
Sportspeople from Jämtland County